Jonathan Yardley (born October 27, 1939) was the book critic at The Washington Post from 1981 to December 2014, and held the same post from 1978 to 1981 at the Washington Star. In 1981, he received the Pulitzer Prize for Criticism.

Background and education
Yardley was born on October 27, 1939 in Pittsburgh and spent his childhood in Chatham, Virginia. His father,  William Woolsey Yardley, was a teacher of English and the classics, as well as an Episcopal minister and a headmaster at two East Coast private schools. His mother was  Helen Gregory Yardley.

Yardley graduated from the University of North Carolina at Chapel Hill. There, he was a member of St. Anthony Hall and was the editor of the student newspaper, The Daily Tar Heel, in 1961.

Career
After leaving Chapel Hill, Yardley interned at the New York Times as assistant to James Reston, the columnist and Washington Bureau chief. From 1964 to 1974, Yardley worked as an editorial writer and book reviewer at the Greensboro Daily News; during this time, he was also a Nieman Fellow at Harvard University, academic year 1968-1969, where he studied American literature and literary biography. From 1974 to 1978, Yardley served as book editor of the Miami Herald. From 1978 to 1981, he was the book critic at the Washington Star, receiving a Pulitzer Prize for distinguished criticism in 1981. In 1981, Yardley became book critic and columnist at the Washington Post.

Yardley is the author of several books, among them biographies of Frederick Exley and Ring Lardner. His memoir about his family, Our Kind of People, describes his parents' 50-year marriage and casts a wry eye on the American WASP experience. He edited H.L. Mencken's posthumous literary and journalistic memoir, My Life as Author and Editor. He has written introductions to books by Graham Greene, A. J. Liebling, Booth Tarkington and others.

Yardley is known simultaneously as a scathingly frank critic and a starmaker. Among the talents he has brought to public light and championed are Michael Chabon, Edward P. Jones, Anne Tyler, William Boyd, Olga Grushin and John Berendt. He wrote a famously harsh review of Joe McGinniss' book The Last Brother:  The Rise and Fall of Teddy Kennedy, saying "Not merely is it a textbook example of shoddy journalistic and publishing ethics; it is also a genuinely, unrelievedly rotten book, one without a single redeeming virtue, an embarrassment that should bring nothing except shame to everyone associated with it."

In February 2003, Yardley began a series called "Second Reading", described as “An occasional series in which The Post’s book critic reconsiders notable and/or neglected books from the past.” Every month or so, for the next seven years, he published essays about notable books from the past, many of which had gone out of print or were in some way seen as worth reading again. It was in this series  that he gained attention for his highly critical look at The Catcher in the Rye in 2004. A collection of the Second Reading columns was published by Europa Editions in July 2011.

On December 5, 2014, Yardley announced his retirement as book critic of the Post.

Publications

Books 
 Second Reading: Notable and Neglected Books Revisited.  New York: Europa Editions, 2011. 
 Monday Morning Quarterback. Lanham: Rowman & Littlefield Publishers, Inc., 1998.  
 Misfit: The Strange Life of Frederick Exley. New York: Random House, 1997.  
 Out of Step: Notes From a Purple Decade. New York: Random House, 1993.   
 States of Mind: A Personal Journey Through the Mid-Atlantic. Villard Publishing, 1993.  
 Our Kind of People: The Story of an American Family. New York: Grove Press, 1989.  
 Ring: A Biography of Ring Lardner. New York: Random House, 1977.

As editor 
 H.L. Mencken, My Life as Author and Editor. New York: Knopf, 1993.

Awards
Yardley was awarded the 1981 Pulitzer Prize for Criticism. Yardley has been a Nieman Fellow. Yardley was awarded an honorary doctorate of letters by George Washington University in 1987, and a distinguished alumnus award by the University of North Carolina at Chapel Hill in 1989.

Personal life 
Yardley is married to biographer/novelist Marie Arana, the former editor of Washington Post Book World. His sons, Jim Yardley and William Yardley, with his first wife Rosemary Roberts, are New York Times reporters, and William writes for the Los Angeles Times as well. He and his son Jim are one of two father-son recipients of the Pulitzer Prize.

See also
Michael Dirda
Ron Charles

References

External links
 Inventory of the Jonathan Yardley Papers, 1792-2006, in the Southern Historical Collection, UNC-Chapel Hill.

Interview at Washington Technology
Book reviews, by Yardley at The Washington Post

1939 births
University of North Carolina at Chapel Hill alumni
Nieman Fellows
Writers from Pittsburgh
Living people
American biographers
American literary critics
The Washington Star people
The Washington Post people
Pulitzer Prize for Criticism winners
American male journalists
American male biographers
20th-century American journalists
21st-century American journalists
Journalists from Pennsylvania
20th-century American male writers
21st-century American male writers